Mozăceni is a commune in Argeș County, Muntenia, Romania. It is composed of three villages: Babaroaga, Mozăceni and Zidurile.

References

Communes in Argeș County
Localities in Muntenia